The United Provinces of the Netherlands, officially the Republic of the Seven United Netherlands, and commonly referred to in historiography as the Dutch Republic, was a confederation that existed from 1579 until the Batavian Revolution in 1795. It was a predecessor state of the present-day Netherlands. The republic was established after seven Dutch provinces in the Spanish Netherlands revolted against Spanish rule, forming a mutual alliance against Spain in 1579 (the Union of Utrecht) and declaring their independence in 1581 (the Act of Abjuration). It comprised Groningen, Frisia, Overijssel, Guelders, Utrecht, Holland and Zeeland.

Although the state was small and contained only around 1.5 million inhabitants, it controlled a worldwide network of seafaring trade routes. Through its trading companies, the Dutch East India Company (VOC) and the Dutch West India Company (GWC), it established a Dutch colonial empire. The income from this trade allowed the Dutch Republic to compete militarily against much larger countries. It amassed a huge fleet of 2,000 ships, initially larger than the fleets of England and France combined. Major conflicts were fought in the Eighty Years' War against Spain (from the foundation of the Dutch Republic until 1648), the Dutch–Portuguese War (1602–1663), four Anglo-Dutch Wars (the first against the Commonwealth of England, two against the Kingdom of England, and a fourth against the Kingdom of Great Britain: 1652–1654, 1665–1667, 1672–1674 and 1780–1784), the Franco-Dutch War (1672–1678), War of the Grand Alliance (1688–1697), the War of the Spanish Succession (1702–1713), the War of Austrian Succession (1744-1748) and the War of the First Coalition (1792-1795) against the Kingdom of France.

The republic was more tolerant of different religions and ideas than its contemporary states were, allowing freedom of thought to its residents. Artists flourished under this regime, including painters such as Rembrandt, Johannes Vermeer and many others. So did scientists, such as Hugo Grotius, Christiaan Huygens and Antonie van Leeuwenhoek. Because Dutch trade, science, military, and art were among the most acclaimed in the world during much of the 17th century, this period became known in Dutch history as the Dutch Golden Age.

The republic was a confederation of provinces each with a high degree of independence from the federal assembly, known as the States General. In the Peace of Westphalia (1648) the republic gained approximately 20% more territory, located outside the member provinces, which was ruled directly by the States General as Generality Lands. The position gradually became hereditary, with the Prince of Orange simultaneously holding most or all of the stadtholderships, making him effectively the head of state. This created tension between political factions: the Orangists favoured a powerful stadtholder, while the Republicans favoured a strong States General. The Republicans forced two Stadtholderless Periods, 1650–1672 and 1702–1747, with the latter causing national instability and the end of Great Power status.

Economic decline led to a period of political instability known as the Patriottentijd (1780–1787). This unrest was temporarily suppressed by a Prussian invasion in support of the stadtholder. The French Revolution and subsequent War of the First Coalition caused these tensions to reignite. Following military defeat by France, the stadtholder was expelled in the Batavian Revolution of 1795. This ended the Dutch Republic; it was succeeded by the Batavian Republic.

History 

Until the 16th century, the Low Countries—corresponding roughly to the present-day Netherlands, Belgium, and Luxembourg—consisted of a number of duchies, counties, and prince-bishoprics, almost all of which were under the supremacy of the Holy Roman Empire, with the exception of the County of Flanders, most of which was under the Kingdom of France.

Most of the Low Countries had come under the rule of the House of Burgundy and subsequently the House of Habsburg. In 1549, Holy Roman Emperor Charles V issued the Pragmatic Sanction, which further unified the Seventeen Provinces under his rule. Charles was succeeded by his son, King Philip II of Spain. In 1568, the Netherlands, led by William I of Orange, together with Philip de Montmorency, Count of Hoorn, and Lamoral, Count of Egmont revolted against Philip II because of high taxes, persecution of Protestants by the government, and Philip's efforts to modernize and centralize the devolved-medieval government structures of the provinces. This was the start of the Eighty Years' War. During the initial phase of the war, the revolt was largely unsuccessful. Spain regained control over most of the rebelling provinces. This period is known as the "Spanish Fury" due to the high number of massacres, instances of mass looting, and total destruction of multiple cities and in particular Antwerp between 1572 and 1579.

In 1579, a number of the northern provinces of the Low Countries signed the Union of Utrecht, in which they promised to support each other in their defence against the Army of Flanders. This was followed in 1581 by the Act of Abjuration, the declaration of independence of the provinces from Philip II. Dutch colonialism began at this point, as the Netherlands was able to swipe a number of Portuguese and Spanish colonies, particularly in the Asia-Pacific region. After the assassination of William of Orange on 10 July 1584, both Henry III of France and Elizabeth I of England declined offers of sovereignty. However, the latter agreed to turn the United Provinces into a protectorate of England (Treaty of Nonsuch, 1585), and sent the Earl of Leicester as governor-general. This was unsuccessful and in 1588 the provinces became a confederacy. The Union of Utrecht is regarded as the foundation of the Republic of the Seven United Provinces, which was not recognized by Spain until the Peace of Westphalia in 1648.

During the Anglo-French War (1778–1783), the internal territory was divided into two groups: the Patriots, who were pro-French and pro-American, and the Orangists, who were pro-British. The Republic of the United Provinces faced a series of republican revolutions in 1783–1787. During this period, republican forces occupied several major Dutch cities. Initially on the defence, the Orangist forces received aid from Prussian troops and retook the Netherlands in 1787. The republican forces fled to France, but then successfully re-invaded alongside the army of the French Republic (1793–1795), ousting stadtholder William V, abolishing the Dutch Republic, and replacing it with the Batavian Republic (1795–1806). After the French Republic became the French Empire under Napoleon, the Batavian Republic was replaced by the Napoleonic Kingdom of Holland (1806–1810).

The Netherlands regained independence from France in 1813. In the Anglo-Dutch Treaty of 1814 the names "United Provinces of the Netherlands" and "United Netherlands" were used. In 1815, it was rejoined with the Austrian Netherlands and Liège (the "Southern provinces") to become the Kingdom of the Netherlands, informally known as the United Kingdom of the Netherlands, to create a strong buffer state north of France. On 16 March 1815, the son of stadtholder William V crowned himself King William I of the Netherlands. Between 1815 and 1890, the King of the Netherlands was also in a personal union the Grand Duke of the sovereign Grand Duchy of Luxembourg. After Belgium gained its independence in 1830, the state became unequivocally known as the "Kingdom of the Netherlands", as it remains today.

Economy 

During the Dutch Golden Age in the late-16th and 17th centuries, the Dutch Republic dominated world trade, conquering a vast colonial empire and operating the largest fleet of merchantmen of any nation. The County of Holland was the wealthiest and most urbanized region in the world. In 1650 the urban population of the Dutch Republic as a percentage of total population was 31.7 percent, while that of the Spanish Netherlands was 20.8 percent, of Portugal 16.6 percent, and of Italy 14 percent. In 1675 the urban population density of Holland alone was 61 percent, compared to the rest of the Dutch Republic, where 27 percent lived in urban areas.

The free trade spirit of the time was augmented by the development of a modern, effective stock market in the Low Countries. The Netherlands has the oldest stock exchange in the world, founded in 1602 by the Dutch East India Company, while Rotterdam has the oldest bourse in the Netherlands. The Dutch East-India Company exchange went public in six different cities. Later, a court ruled that the company had to reside legally in a single city, so Amsterdam is recognized as the oldest such institution based on modern trading principles. While the banking system evolved in the Low Countries, it was quickly incorporated by the well-connected English, stimulating English economic output.

During the period of proto-industrialization, the empire received 50% of textiles and 80% of silks imported from the Indian Mughal Empire, chiefly from its most developed region known as Bengal Subah.

The Dutch Republic was a master of banking, often compared to 14th century Florence. When Southern Europe was experiencing poor harvests, surplus grain from Poland was sold by the Dutch for large profits.

Politics 

The republic was a confederation of seven provinces, which had their own governments and were very independent, and a number of so-called Generality Lands. The latter were governed directly by the States General, the federal government. The States General were seated in The Hague and consisted of representatives of each of the seven provinces. The provinces of the republic were, in official feudal order:
 Duchy of Guelders
 County of Holland
 County of Zeeland
 Lordship of Utrecht
 Lordship of Overijssel
 Lordship of Frisia
 Lordship of Groningen

There was an eighth province, the County of Drenthe, but this area was so poor that it was exempt from paying federal taxes, and as a consequence, it was denied representation in the States General. Each province was governed by the Provincial States, the main executive official (though not the official head of state) was a raadspensionaris. In times of war, the stadtholder, who commanded the army, would have more power than the raadspensionaris.

In theory, the stadtholders were freely appointed by and subordinate to the states of each province. However, in practice the princes of Orange of the House of Orange-Nassau, beginning with William the Silent, were always chosen as stadtholders of most of the provinces. Zeeland and usually Utrecht had the same stadtholder as Holland. There was a constant power struggle between the Orangists, who supported the stadtholders and specifically the princes of Orange, and the Republicans, who supported the States General and hoped to replace the semi-hereditary nature of the stadtholdership with a true republican structure.

After the Peace of Westphalia, several border territories were assigned to the United Provinces. They were federally governed Generality Lands. These were Staats-Brabant, Staats-Vlaanderen, Staats-Overmaas, and (after the Treaty of Utrecht) Staats-Opper-Gelre. The States General of the United Provinces were in control of the Dutch East India Company and the Dutch West India Company, but some shipping expeditions were initiated by some of the provinces, mostly Holland and Zeeland.

The framers of the United States Constitution were influenced by the Constitution of the Republic of the United Provinces, as Federalist No. 20, by James Madison, shows. Such influence appears, however, to have been of a negative nature, as Madison describes the Dutch confederacy as exhibiting "Imbecility in the government; discord among the provinces; foreign influence and indignities; a precarious existence in peace, and peculiar calamities from war." Apart from this, the American Declaration of Independence is similar to the Act of Abjuration, essentially the declaration of independence of the United Provinces, but concrete evidence that the latter directly influenced the former is absent.

Religion 

In the Union of Utrecht of 20 January 1579, Holland and Zeeland were granted the right to accept only one religion (in practice, Calvinism). Every other province had the freedom to regulate the religious question as it wished, although the Union stated every person should be free in the choice of personal religion and that no person should be prosecuted based on religious choice. William of Orange had been a strong supporter of public and personal freedom of religion and hoped to unite Protestants and Catholics in the new union, and, for him, the Union was a defeat. In practice, Catholic services in all provinces were quickly forbidden, and the Dutch Reformed Church became the "public" or "privileged" church in the republic.

During the republic, any person who wished to hold public office had to conform to the Reformed Church and take an oath to this effect. The extent to which different religions or denominations were persecuted depended much on the time period and regional or city leaders. In the beginning, this was especially focused on Roman Catholics, being the religion of the enemy. In 17th-century Leiden, for instance, people opening their homes to services could be fined 200 guilders (a year's wage for a skilled tradesman) and banned from the city. Throughout this, however, personal freedom of religion existed and was one factor—along with economic reasons—in causing large immigration of religious refugees from other parts of Europe.

In the first years of the republic, controversy arose within the Reformed Church, mainly around the subject of predestination. This has become known as the struggle between Arminianism and Gomarism, or between Remonstrants and Contra-Remonstrants. In 1618, the Synod of Dort tackled this issue, which led to the banning of the Remonstrant faith.

Beginning in the 18th century, the situation changed from more or less active persecution of religious services to a state of restricted toleration of other religions, as long as their services took place secretly in private churches.

Decline 

Long-term rivalry between the two main factions in Dutch society, the Staatsgezinden (Republicans, Dutch States Party) and the Prinsgezinden (Royalists or Orangists), sapped the strength and unity of the country. Johan de Witt and the Republicans did reign supreme for a time at the middle of the 17th century (the First Stadtholderless Period) until his overthrow and murder in 1672. Subsequently, William III of Orange became stadtholder. After a 22-year stadtholderless era, the Orangists regained power, and his first problem was to survive the Franco-Dutch War (with the derivative Third Anglo-Dutch war), when France, England, Münster, and Cologne united against this country.

Wars to contain the expansionist policies of France in various coalitions after the Glorious Revolution, mostly including England and Scotland—after 1707, Great Britain—burdened the republic with huge debts, although little of the fighting after 1673 took place on its own territory. The necessity to maintain a vast army against France meant that less money could be spent on the navy, weakening the republic's economy. After William III's death in 1702 the Second Stadtholderless Period was inaugurated. Despite having contributed much in the War of the Spanish Succession, the Dutch Republic gained little from the peace talks in Utrecht (1713). However, the Dutch had over a period of forthy years successfully defended their positions in the Southern Netherlands and their troops were central in the alliances which had halted French territorial expansion in Europe until 1792. The end of the War of the Austrian Succession in 1748, and Austria becoming allies with France against Prussia, marked the end of the republic as a major military power.

Fierce competition for trade and colonies, especially from France and England, furthered the economic downturn of the country. The three Anglo-Dutch Wars and the rise of mercantilism had a negative effect on Dutch shipping and commerce.

See also 
List of countries that gained independence from Spain
Dutch Empire
Dutch East India Company

References

Footnotes

Bibliography 

 
 
 
 Hoftijzer, Paul G., The Dutch Republic, Centre of the European Book Trade in the 17th Century, EGO – European History Online, Mainz: Institute of European History, 2015, retrieved: 8 March 2020 (pdf).

External links 
 

 
1581 establishments in Europe
1581 establishments in the Dutch Republic
16th century in the Netherlands
17th century in the Dutch Republic
1795 disestablishments in Europe
1795 disestablishments in the Dutch Republic
18th century in the Dutch Republic
Early Modern Netherlands
Former confederations
Former polities in the Netherlands
Former republics
Republicanism in the Netherlands
States and territories disestablished in 1795
States and territories established in 1581
Christian states